Winzenhohler Bach is a river of Bavaria, Germany. It is a headwater of the Nonnenbach near Hösbach.

See also
List of rivers of Bavaria

Rivers of Bavaria
Rivers of Germany

de:Nonnenbach (Aschaff)#Quellbäche